Kurukshetram is a 1977 Indian Telugu-language Hindu mythological film produced by A. S. R. Anjaneyulu and directed by Kamalakara Kameswara Rao. It stars Krishna, Sobhan Babu, Krishnam Raju and Kaikala Satyanarayana while Jamuna, Vijaya Nirmala, Anjali Devi and Gummadi played other important roles.

Plot

Cast

Location

While Krishna was busy with the Kurukshetram, NTR was busy with the production of Daana Veera Soora Karna. While the former was shot in Mysore, Rajasthan, and other places with huge settings, DVSK was made locally in Ramakrishna Cine Studios.  The people who worked for both the films were Gummadi (Parasurama in DVSK), Kaikala Satyanarayana (Bheema in DVSK), Dhulipala (Shakuni in DVSK), Mukkamala (Shalya in  DVSK).

Soundtrack
 "Dharma Kshertam" (Lyricist: Sri Sri; Singers: S. P. Balasubrahmanyam)
 "Alukala Kulukula" (Lyricist: Veturi; Singers: S. P. Balasubrahmanyam, P. Susheela)
 "Ide Mayasabha Mandiram" (Lyricist: Jr. Samudrala; Singers: P. Susheela)
 "Harivillu Divinunchi" (Lyricist: Aarudhra; Singers: P. Susheela, V. Ramakrishna)
 "Mrogindi Kalyanaveena" (Lyricist: C. Narayana Reddy; Singers: S. P. Balasubrahmanyam, P. Susheela)

External links

References

1977 films
1970s Telugu-language films
Hindu mythological films
Films directed by Kamalakara Kameswara Rao
Films scored by S. Rajeswara Rao
Films shot in Mysore
Films based on the Mahabharata